Psalm is the fifth album by Paul Motian to be released on the ECM label. It was released in 1982 and features the first recordings by Motian with guitarist Bill Frisell, tenor saxophonist Joe Lovano, alto saxophonist Billy Drewes and bassist Ed Schuller.

Reception
The Allmusic review by Scott Yanow awarded the album 4½ stars, stating: "The eight compositions by drummer Paul Motian on this ECM release (which is available on CD) are rather dry and none caught on as future standards. But the playing by Motian's sidemen (tenors Joe Lovano and Billy Drewes, bassist Ed Schuller and especially the remarkable guitarist Bill Frisell) uplifted the music and gave this group a strong personality of its own. Although the results are not all that memorable, the music should please adventurous listeners. ".

Track listing
 "Psalm" - 6:57  
 "White Magic" - 3:00  
 "Boomerang" - 5:43  
 "Fantasm" - 6:07  
 "Mandeville" - 5:03  
 "Second Hand" - 9:16  
 "Etude" - 4:16  
 "Yahllah" - 7:39

All compositions by Paul Motian
Recorded December 1981 at Tonstudio Bauer, Ludwigsburg

Personnel
Paul Motian – drums
Bill Frisell – electric guitar
Joe Lovano – tenor saxophone
Billy Drewes – tenor and alto saxophones
Ed Schuller – bass

References 

1982 albums
Paul Motian albums
ECM Records albums
Albums produced by Manfred Eicher